Li Na (born December 9, 1982) is a Chinese professional track cyclist.

Palmarès 

 2002
 World Championships, Copenhagen
 1st, Keirin
 Asian Games, Busan
 1st, Sprint
2003
2003 World Cup
2nd, Keirin, Aguascalientes

External links 

1982 births
Living people
Chinese female cyclists
Place of birth missing (living people)
Asian Games medalists in cycling
Cyclists at the 2002 Asian Games
UCI Track Cycling World Champions (women)
Medalists at the 2002 Asian Games
Asian Games gold medalists for China
Chinese track cyclists
21st-century Chinese women